The Town of Camperdown was a local government area about  west-southwest of Melbourne, the state capital of Victoria, Australia, centred on Camperdown. Its area was surrounded by the Shire of Hampden.

History

Originally, the town's area was part of the East Riding of the Shire of Hampden, which was incorporated in 1857. On 9 September 1952, Camperdown was severed and incorporated as a separate borough. It became a town on 21 January 1959.

On 23 September 1994, the Town of Camperdown was abolished, and along with the Shire of Hampden and parts of the Shires of Colac, Heytesbury, Mortlake, and the area around Princetown, on the Great Ocean Road, was merged into the newly created Corangamite Shire.

Wards
The Town of Camperdown was not subdivided into wards, and the nine councillors represented the entire area.

Population

* Estimate in 1958 Victorian Year Book.

References

External links
 Victorian Places - Camperdown

Camperdown Town
1952 establishments in Australia
Camperdown, Victoria